Kazakhstan competed at the 2000 Summer Olympics in Sydney, Australia. 130 competitors, 86 men and 44 women, took part in 104 events in 17 sports.

Medalists

Archery

The Kazakh archers won five matches in 2000, three more than they had four years earlier.  Two archers advanced to the round of 16 and the men's team made it to the quarterfinals.

Men's Team:
 Shikarev, Zabrodskiy, and Li – quarterfinal, 7th place (1-1)

Athletics

Men's Competition
Men's 100 m
 Vitaliy Medvedev
 Round 1 – 10.75 (→ did not advance)

Men's 200 m
 Gennadiy Chernovol
 Round 1 – 20.95 (→ did not advance)

Men's Shot Put
 Sergey Rubtsov
 Qualifying – 15.90 (→ did not advance)

Men's Triple Jump
 Sergey Arzamasov
 Qualifying – 16.70 (→ did not advance)

 Oleg Sakirkin
 Qualifying – 16.20 (→ did not advance)

Men's High Jump
 Yuriy Pakhlyayev
 Qualifying – 2.24 (→ did not advance)

Men's Pole Vault
 Igor Potapovich
 Qualifying – NM (→ did not advance)

Men's 20 km Walk
 Valeriy Borisov
 Final – 1:28:36 (→ 38th place)

Men's 50 km Walk
 Sergey Korepanov
 Final – 3:53:30 (→ 15th place)

 Valeriy Borisov
 Final – 4:01:11 (→ 25th place)

Women's Competition
Women's 100 m
 Viktoria Kovyreva
 Round 1 – 11.72 (→ did not advance)

Women's 400 m
 Svetlana Bodritskaya
 Round 1 – 53.91 (→ did not advance)

Women's 100 m Hurdles
 Olga Shishigina
 Round 1 – 12.81
 Round 2 – 12.66
 Semifinal – 12.71
 Final – 12.65 (→ Gold Medal)

Women's 400 m Hurdles
 Natalya Torshina
 Round 1 – 56.38
 Semifinal – 56.22 (→ did not advance)

Women's Shot Put
 Iolanta Ulyeva
 Qualifying – 16.38 (→ did not advance)

Women's Long Jump
 Yelena Kashcheyeva
 Qualifying – 6.57 (→ did not advance)

 Yelena Pershina
 Qualifying – 6.24 (→ did not advance)

 Anna Tarasova
 Qualifying – NM (→ did not advance)

Women's Triple Jump
 Yelena Parfenova
 Qualifying – 13.50 (→ did not advance)

 Anna Tarasova
 Qualifying – 13.11 (→ did not advance)

Women's High Jump
 Svetlana Zalevskaya
 Qualifying – 1.94
 Final – 1.96 (→ 6th place)

Women's 20 km Walk
 Svetlana Tolstaya
 Final – 1:35:19 (→ 21st place)

 Yelena Kuznetsova
 Final – 1:42:45 (→ 40th place)

 Maya Sazonova
 Final – DNF

Women's Marathon
 Garifa Kuku
 Final – DNF

Women's Heptathlon
 Svetlana Kazanina
 100 m Hurdles – 14.71
 High Jump – 1.75
 Shot Put – 12.97
 200 m – 25.04
 Long Jump – 5.84
 Javelin Throw – 43.53
 800 m – 02:10.45
 Points – 5898 (→ 16th place)

 Irina Naumenko
 100 m Hurdles – 14.26
 High Jump – 1.84
 Shot Put – 11.26
 200 m – 25.19
 Long Jump – 5.88
 Javelin Throw – 32.53
 800 m – 02:18.49
 Points – 5634 (→ 21st place)

Boxing

Men's Flyweight (– 51 kg)
Bulat Jumadilov
Round 1 – Bye 
Round 2 – Defeated Kennedy Kanyanta of Zambia
Quarterfinal – Defeated Vakhtang Darchinian of Armenia
Semifinal – Defeated Jérôme Thomas of France
Final – Lost to Winjad Ponlid of Thailand → Silver medal

Men's Featherweight (– 57 kg)
Bekzat Sattarkhanov
Round 1 – Defeated Bobirnat Ovidiu Tiberiu of Romania
Round 2 – Defeated Jeffrey Mathebula of South Africa
Quarterfinal – Defeated Ramazan Palyani of Turkey
Semifinal – Defeated Tahar Tamsamani of Morocco
Final – Defeated Ricardo Mortel of United States → Gold medal

Men's Lightweight (– 60 kg)
Nurzhan Karimzhanov
Round 1 – Defeated Artur Guevorkian of Armenia
Round 2 – Defeated Michael Katsidis of Australia
Quarterfinal – Lost to Andriy Kotelnyk of Ukraine (→ did not advance)

Men's Welterweight (– 67 kg)
Daniyar Munaytbasov
Round 1 – Defeated Paulus Ali Nuumbembe of Namibia
Round 2 – Defeated Leonard Bundu of Italy
Quarterfinal – Lost to Sergey Dotsenko of Ukraine (→ did not advance)

Men's Light Middleweight (– 71 kg)
Yermakhan Ibraimov
Round 1 – Defeated Yousif Massas of Syria
Round 2 – Defeated Hely Yánes of Venezuela
Quarterfinal – Defeated Juan Hernández Sierra of Cuba
Semifinal – Defeated Jermain Taylor of United States
Final – Defeated Marin Simion of Romania → Gold medal

Men's Light Heavyweight (– 81 kg)
Olzhas Orazaliyev
Round 1 – Defeated Hugo Garay of Argentina
Round 2 – Defeated Isael Alvarez of Cuba
Quarterfinal – Lost to Sergei Mikhailov of Uzbekistan (→ did not advance)

Men's Super Heavyweight (+ 91 kg)
Mukhtarkhan Dildabekov
Round 1 – Bye 
Round 2 – Defeated Grzegorz Kielsa of Poland
Quarterfinal – Defeated Alexis Rubalcaba of Cuba
Semifinal – Defeated Rustam Saidov of Uzbekistan
Final – Lost to Audley Harrison of Great Britain → Silver medal

Canoeing

Flatwater

Men's competition
Men's Kayak Singles 500 m
 Sergey Sergin
 Qualifying Heat – 01:47.253 (→ did not advance)

Men's Kayak Singles 1,000 m
 Sergey Sergin
 Qualifying Heat – 03:42.645
 Semifinal – 03:47.633 (→ did not advance)

Men's Canoe Singles 500 m
 Kaisar Nurmaganbetov
 Qualifying Heat – 01:55.422
 Semifinal – 01:54.465 (→ did not advance)

Men's Canoe Singles 1,000 m
 Kaisar Nurmaganbetov
 Qualifying Heat – 04:01.438
 Semifinal – 04:05.206 (→ did not advance)

Men's Canoe Doubles 500 m
 Konstantin Negodyayev and Zhomart Satubaldin
 Qualifying Heat – 01:45.810
 Semifinal – 01:45.809
 Final – 02:01.436 (→ 7th place)

Men's Canoe Doubles 1,000 m
 Konstantin Negodyayev and Zhomart Satubaldin
 Qualifying Heat – 03:53.366
 Semifinal – 03:48.756 (→ did not advance)

Cycling

Road Cycling
Men's Individual Time Trial
 Andrei Teteriouk
 Final – 0:58:52 (→ 6th place)

 Alexander Vinokourov
 Final – 1:01:34 (→ 27th place)

Men's Road Race
 Alexander Vinokourov
 Final – 5:29:17 (Silver medal)

 Andrei Teteriouk
 Final – 5:30:46 (→ 46th place)

 Alexandr Shefer
 Final – 5:30:46 (→ 53rd place)

 Sergei Yakovlev
 Final – 5:30:46 (→ 57th place)

 Andrei Kivilev
 Final – 5:30:46 (→ 73rd place)

Track Cycling
Men's Individual Pursuit
Vadim Kravchenko
Qualifying – 04:40.410 (→ did not advance)

Men's Point Race
Sergey Lavrenenko
Points – 1
Laps Down – 2 (→ 20th place)

Diving

Men's 3 Metre Springboard
 Alisher Seitov
 Preliminary – 307.62 (→ did not advance, 42nd place)

Men's 10 Metre Platform
 Damir Akhmetbekov
 Preliminary – 75.42 (→ did not advance, 42nd place)

Men's 10 Metre Platform
 Alexey Gurman
 Preliminary – 320.13 (→ did not advance, 31st place)

Women's 3 Metre Springboard
 Natalya Popova
 Preliminary – 234.90 (→ did not advance, 28th place)

Women's 3 Metre Springboard
 Irina Vyguzova
 Preliminary – 303.30
 Semi-final – 217.47 – 520.77
 Final – 310.86 – 528.33 (→ 9th place)

Women's 10 Metre Platform
 Irina Vyguzova
 Preliminary – 284.52
 Semi-final – 157.15 – 441.69 (→ did not advance, 15th place)

Women's 10 Metre Platform
 Natalya Chikina
 Preliminary – 269.58
 Semi-final – 162.27 – 458.85
 Final – 304.53 – 466.80 (→ 9th place)

Fencing

Five fencers, three men and two women, represented Kazakhstan in 2000.

Men's foil
 Andrey Kolganov

Men's épée
 Sergey Shabalin

Men's sabre
 Igor Tsel

Women's foil
 Nelya Sevostiyanova

Women's épée
 Nataliya Goncharova

Gymnastics

Judo

Rowing

Shooting

Swimming

Men's 50 m Freestyle
 Sergey Borisenko
 Preliminary Heat – 23.46 (→ did not advance)

Men's 100 m Freestyle
 Igor Sitnikov
 Preliminary Heat – 52.57 (→ did not advance)

Men's 200 m Freestyle
 Andrey Kvasov
 Preliminary Heat – 1:55.72 (→ did not advance)

Men's 100 m Butterfly
 Andrey Gavrilov
 Preliminary Heat – 56.14 (→ did not advance)

Men's 100 m Breaststroke
 Aleksandr Savitsky
 Preliminary Heat – 01:05.95 (→ did not advance)

Men's 100 m Backstroke
 Pavel Sidorov
 Preliminary Heat – 01:01.02 (→ did not advance)

Men's 200 m Individual Medley
 Grigoriy Matuzkov
 Preliminary Heat – 02:05.45 (→ did not advance)

Men's 400 m Individual Medley
 Grigoriy Matuzkov
 Preliminary Heat – 04:31.89 (→ did not advance)

Men's 4 × 100 m Freestyle
 Igor Sitnikov, Andrey Kvasov, Pavel Sidorov, and Sergey Borisenko
 Preliminary Heat – 03:28.90 (→ did not advance, 21st place)

Women's 200 m Individual Medley
 Marina Mulyayeva
 Preliminary Heat – 02:22.72 (→ did not advance)

Synchronized swimming

Duet
 Aliya Karimova, Galina Shatnaya
 Technical Routine – 29.12 Did not compete in free routine

Triathlon

Men

Water polo

Men's Team Competition

Preliminary Round (Group A)
 Lost to Spain (7-8)
 Tied with Australia (11-11)
 Lost to Russia (7-9)
 Defeated Slovakia (9-5)
 Lost to Italy (7-13)
Classification Round
 Tied with Greece (6-6)
 Defeated Slovakia (11-8)
 Defeated the Netherlands (6-4) → Ninth place

Team Roster
Roman Chentsov
Konstantin Chernov
Sergey Drozdov
Aleksandr Yelke
Askar Orazalinov
Yevgeny Prokhin
Artemy Sevostyanov
Aleksandr Shvedov
Igor Zagoruykov
Ivan Zaytsev
Yevgeny Zhilyayev
Denis Zhivchikov

Women's Team Competition

Preliminary Round Robin

 Classification Match

Team Roster
Rezeda Aleyeva
Anastasiya Boroda
Irina Borodavko
Svetlana Buravova
Nataliya Galkina
Yekaterina Gerzanich
Tatyana Gubina
Nataliya Ignatyeva
Asel Dzhakayeva
Svetlana Koroleva
Olga Leshchuk
Larisa Olkhina
Yuliya Pyryseva

Weightlifting

Men

Women

Wrestling

Notes

Wallechinsky, David (2004). The Complete Book of the Summer Olympics (Athens 2004 Edition). Toronto, Canada. . 
International Olympic Committee (2001). The Results. Retrieved 12 November 2005.
Sydney Organising Committee for the Olympic Games (2001). Official Report of the XXVII Olympiad Volume 1: Preparing for the Games. Retrieved 20 November 2005.
Sydney Organising Committee for the Olympic Games (2001). Official Report of the XXVII Olympiad Volume 2: Celebrating the Games. Retrieved 20 November 2005.
Sydney Organising Committee for the Olympic Games (2001). The Results. Retrieved 20 November 2005.
International Olympic Committee Web Site

References

Nations at the 2000 Summer Olympics
2000
2000 in Kazakhstani sport